Cold Water Spring State Preserve is a  parcel state preserve protecting a spring that issues from Cold Water Cave, an extensive cave system in Winneshiek County, Iowa and Fillmore County, Minnesota. The spring is a tributary of the Upper Iowa River.

The cave system has some unusual features such as its rate of expansion, which is higher than that of most caves. It also has relatively low amounts of oxygen and high amounts of carbon dioxide. The cave is a National Natural Landmark, designated in 1987.In 1987, the Cold Water Cave was designated as a National Natural Landmark by the National Park Service.

There are two entries; both are on private property.

Coldwater Creek Wildlife Management Area is a state hunting ground near Bluffton, and is near to the cave system.

The cave is located in the Driftless Area of Iowa and Minnesota, a region characterized by karst topography, which involves disappearing streams, blind valleys, sinkholes, caves, cold springs, and cold streams, all of which are present here.

Sources
Cold Water Spring State Preserve Retrieved July 22, 2007
Karstpreserve.com, retrieved July 22, 2007
Interview with John Ackerman, July, 2003, retrieved July 22, 2007

References

External links
Exploring Iowa's Coldwater Cave Documentary produced by Iowa Public Television

Iowa state preserves
Protected areas of Winneshiek County, Iowa
Protected areas of Fillmore County, Minnesota
Driftless Area
Caves of Iowa
Springs of the United States
Caves of Minnesota
Springs of Minnesota
Limestone caves
National Natural Landmarks in Iowa
Protected areas established in 1987
1987 establishments in Minnesota
Landforms of Winneshiek County, Iowa
Bodies of water of Fillmore County, Minnesota